This list of earthquakes in Bulgaria is organized by date and includes events that caused injuries/fatalities, historic quakes, as well events that are notable for other reasons.

Earthquakes 
Key
  Epicenter outside Bulgaria

Gallery

See also 
 List of earthquakes in Romania
 List of earthquakes in Italy
 List of earthquakes in Croatia

External links 
 Seismic events in Bulgaria and surrounding regions, last 30 days - real time data from NIGGG-BAS

References 

Bulgaria
Earthquakes
Earthquakes in Bulgaria